Kenji Fukaya (Japanese: 深谷賢治, Fukaya Kenji) is a Japanese mathematician known for his  work in symplectic geometry and  Riemannian geometry. His many fundamental contributions to mathematics include the discovery of the Fukaya category. He is a permanent faculty member at the Simons Center for Geometry and Physics and a professor of mathematics at Stony Brook University.

Biography

Fukaya was both an undergraduate and a graduate student in mathematics at the University of Tokyo, receiving  his BA in 1981, and his PhD  in 1986. In 1987, he joined the University of Tokyo faculty as an associate professor. He then moved to Kyoto University as a full professor in 1994. In 2013, he then moved to the United States in order to join the faculty of the Simons Center for Geometry and Physics at Stony Brook.

The Fukaya category, meaning the  category of whose objects are Lagrangian submanifolds of a given symplectic manifold, is named after him, and is intimately related to Floer homology. Other contributions to symplectic geometry include his proof (with Kaoru Ono) of a weak version of the Arnold conjecture and a construction of general Gromov-Witten invariants. His many other mathematical contributions include important theorems in Riemannian geometry and work on physics-related topics such as gauge theory and mirror symmetry.

Fukaya was awarded the Japanese Mathematical Society's Geometry Prize in 1989  and Spring Prize in 1994. He also received the Inoue Prize in 2002, the Japan Academy Prize in 2003,  the Asahi Prize in 2009, and the Fujihara Award in 2012. He has served on the governing board of the Japanese Mathematical Society and on the Mathematical Committee of the Science Council of Japan.

Fukaya was an invited speaker at the 1990 International Congress of Mathematicians in Kyoto, where he gave a talk entitled, Collapsing Riemannian Manifolds and its Applications.

Selected publications

with T. Yamaguchi The fundamental group of almost non negatively curved manifolds, Annals of Mathematics 136, 1992, pp. 253 – 333

with Kaoru Ono Arnold conjecture and Gromov-Witten invariant, Topology, 38, 1999, pp. 933–1048
with Y. Oh, H. Ohta, K. Ono Lagrangian intersection Floer theory- anomaly and obstruction, 2007
Morse homotopy, -Category, and Floer homologies, in H. J. Kim (editor) Proceedings of Workshop on Geometry and Topology, Seoul National University, 1994, pp. 1 – 102
Floer homology and mirror symmetry. II. Minimal surfaces, geometric analysis and symplectic geometry, Adv. Stud. Pure Math. 34, Math. Soc. Japan, Tokyo, 2002, pp. 31–127
Multivalued Morse theory, asymptotic analysis and mirror symmetry in Graphs and patterns in mathematics and theoretical physics, Proc. Sympos.Pure Math. 73, American Mathematical Society, 2005, pp. 205–278
Editor: Topology, Geometry and Field Theory, World Scientific 1994
Editor: Symplectic geometry and mirror symmetry (Korea Institute for Advanced Study conference, Seoul 2000), World Scientific 2001
Gauge Theory and Topology (in Japanese), Springer Verlag,  Tokyo 1995
Symplectic Geometry (in Japanese), Iwanami Shoten 1999

References

External links

1959 births
Living people
People from Kanagawa Prefecture
20th-century Japanese mathematicians
21st-century Japanese mathematicians
University of Tokyo alumni
Academic staff of Kyoto University
Stony Brook University faculty
Geometers